Procapperia tadzhica is a moth of the family Pterophoridae that lives in Tajikistan.

References

Moths described in 2002
Endemic fauna of Tajikistan
Oxyptilini
Moths of Asia